El Mundo  is a newspaper published in Santa Cruz de la Sierra, Bolivia.

References

External links
El Mundo (Santa Cruz) website

Newspapers published in Bolivia
Mass media in Santa Cruz de la Sierra